Christian Hanson may refer to:

Christian Hanson (footballer) (born 1981), English soccer player
Christian Hanson (ice hockey) (born 1986), American ice hockey player

See also
Chris Hanson (disambiguation)
Christian Hansen (disambiguation)